Lipochaeta, common name nehe, is a genus of flowering plants in the family Asteraceae that is endemic to Hawaii.

Taxonomy
There are difficulties regarding the classification of this genus for its affinities are uncertain. Some studies have been done to clarify its taxonomic and phylogenetic relationships.

Selected species
Lipochaeta connata (Gaudich.) DC. – Nehe	 
Lipochaeta degeneri Sherff – Molokai nehe
Lipochaeta heterophylla A.Gray – Lavaflow nehe
Lipochaeta lobata (Gaudich.) DC. – Shrubland nehe
Lipochaeta lobata var. leptophylla O.Deg. & Sherff
Lipochaeta lobata var. lobata
Lipochaeta rockii Sherff – Rock's nehe
Lipochaeta succulenta (Hook. & Arn.) DC. – Seaside nehe

Formerly placed here
Melanthera fauriei (H.Lév.) W.L.Wagner & H.Rob. (as L. fauriei H.Lév.)
Melanthera kamolensis (O.Deg. & Sherff) W.L.Wagner & H.Rob. (as L. kamolensis O.Deg. & Sherff)
Melanthera micrantha (Nutt.) W.L. Wagner & H.Rob. (as L. micrantha (Nutt.) A.Gray)
Melanthera tenuifolia (A.Gray) W.L. Wagner & H.Rob. (as L. tenuifolia A.Gray)
Melanthera waimeaensis (H.St.John) W.L.Wagner & H.Rob.(as L. waimeaensis H.St.John)
Melanthera venosa (Sherff) W.L.Wagner & H.Rob. (as L. venosa Sherff)
Wedelia acapulcensis var. hispida (Kunth) Strother (as L. texana Torr. & A.Gray)

References

Asteraceae genera
Heliantheae
Endemic flora of Hawaii